Lars Magne Ullvang (born 1 August 1994) is a Norwegian canoeist, born in Haugesund. He qualified to represent Norway at the 2020 Summer Olympics in Tokyo 2021, competing in men's K-1 1000 metres.

References

External links
 
 
 
 

1994 births
Living people
People from Haugesund
Norwegian male canoeists
Canoeists at the 2020 Summer Olympics
Olympic canoeists of Norway
Sportspeople from Rogaland